Kenneth George Wookey (30 December 1946 – 16 December 1992) was a Welsh footballer and football manager. A striker, he spent six years in the Football League. His father, also called Ken Wookey, was also a professional footballer.

He started his career with local club Newport County in 1964. After five years with County, he was loaned out to Lovell's Athletic, before signing permanently with Port Vale in 1969. After helping the "Valiants" to promotion out of the Fourth Division in 1969–70, he transferred to Workington. In 1971, he dropped into non-league football when he joined Yeovil Town. He later played for Salisbury City, Barry Town, Westland Sports, Chard Town, Glastonbury Town, and Sturminster Newton United. He later managed Sturminster Newton and Shaftesbury.

Career
Wookey began his career at Newport County, as the "Ironsides" posted a 16th-place finish in the Fourth Division in 1964–65. He helped Billy Lucas's side up to ninth place in 1965–66, before they dropped down to 18th in 1966–67. Leslie Graham then took charge at Somerton Park, and led Newport to 12th in 1967–68 and then 22nd in 1968–69. Wookey also had a loan spell with Lovell's Athletic.

He signed with Gordon Lee's Port Vale in July 1969. He scored four goals in 29 games of the 1969–70 Fourth Division promotion winning season, but lost his first team place at Vale Park in February 1970 and was given a free transfer to Workington in May of that year. He scoured four goals in 16 Fourth Division games in 1970–71, before leaving Borough Park and the Football League to join Yeovil Town in the Southern League. He later played for Salisbury City, Barry Town, Westland Sports, Chard Town and Glastonbury Town, before becoming player-manager of Sturminster Newton United. After leaving Sturminster he then became the manager of Shaftesbury.

Family
His father Ken was also a professional footballer.

Career statistics
Source:

Honours
Port Vale
Football League Fourth Division fourth-place promotion: 1969–70

References

Footballers from Newport, Wales
Welsh footballers
Association football forwards
Newport County A.F.C. players
Lovell's Athletic F.C. players
Port Vale F.C. players
Workington A.F.C. players
Yeovil Town F.C. players
Salisbury City F.C. players
Barry Town United F.C. players
Westland Sports F.C. players
Chard Town F.C. players
Glastonbury Town F.C. players
Sturminster Newton United F.C. players
English Football League players
Southern Football League players
Association football player-managers
Welsh football managers
Sturminster Newton United F.C. managers
Shaftesbury Town F.C. managers
1946 births
1992 deaths